Hebepetalum is a genus of flowering plants belonging to the family Linaceae.

Its native range is Southern Tropical America.

Species:

Hebepetalum humiriifolium 
Hebepetalum neblinae 
Hebepetalum roraimense

References

Linaceae
Malpighiales genera